The Battle of Pine Bluff, also known as the Action at Pine Bluff, was an engagement during the American Civil War at Pine Bluff, Jefferson County, Arkansas on October 25, 1863. A Union garrison under the command of Col. Powell Clayton successfully defended the town against attacks led by Confederate Brig. Gen. John S. Marmaduke. Much of the fighting took place near Jefferson County Courthouse, which Confederate forces tried unsuccessfully to set ablaze. The Union victory ensured that Pine Bluff was held by the United States' garrison until the end of the Civil War in 1865.

Background 
After the capture of Little Rock, Arkansas, U.S. forces occupied several towns along the Arkansas River. Confederate Brig. Gen. John S. Marmaduke decided to test their strength at Pine Bluff. On October 25, 1863, he attacked the Post of Pine Bluff, a U.S. garrison commanded by Col. Powell Clayton.

Battle 
At 8:00 a.m., Gen. Marmaduke's 2,000 cavalry approached the town from three sides. The 550 federal cavalrymen and Missouri militia, supported by 300 freedmen, barricaded the courthouse square with cotton-bales and positioned the cannon to command the adjacent streets. Marmaduke's Division made several attacks upon the square, then attempted to set the county courthouse on fire. They were unsuccessful and withdrew to Princeton, Arkansas.

See also  
 List of American Civil War battles
 Troop engagements of the American Civil War, 1863

References

Further reading

External links 

 
 Battle of Pine Bluff at Historical Marker Database

 
1863 in Arkansas
Battle of Pine Bluff
Battles of the American Civil War in Arkansas
Battles of the Trans-Mississippi Theater of the American Civil War
Cavalry raids of the American Civil War
Conflicts in 1863
Battle of Pine Bluff
October 1863 events
Union victories of the American Civil War
Pine Bluff